Herodion, Herodium (Latin), or Jabal al-Fureidis is an ancient Jewish fortress and town, located in what is now the West Bank,  south of Jerusalem and  southeast of Bethlehem. It is located between the Palestinian villages of Za'atara and Jannatah, and adjacent to the Israeli settlement of Sdeh Bar and to a military base from the south.

Prior to the publication of Biblical Researches in Palestine in 1841, the site was known variously as Frank Mountain, the Mountain of Little Paradise, or Bethulia; Edward Robinson's identification of the site as Herodium was based on the description found in Josephus. Josephus described a palace fortress and a small town, named after Herod the Great, built between 23 and 15 BCE. A sarcophagus discovered in 2007 was claimed to belong to Herod as it was more ornate than others found in the area. Herodium is 758 meters (2,487 ft) above sea level.

The site is in Area C of the West Bank, formally under the jurisdiction of the Israeli Civil Administration, a body of military officers, and in practice it is administered jointly with the Israel Nature and Parks Authority. Israel asserts that it is entitled to work in the area under the Oslo Accords, but the Palestinian authorities say Israel has no right to undertake digs there or remove artifacts that Israel discovered in excavations there.

Etymology

Herodium is the only site that is named after King Herod the Great. It was known by the Crusaders as the "Mountain of Franks". Palestinian locals historically called it Jabal al-Firdous or Jabal al-Fureidis (lit. "Mountain of the Little Paradise"); Edward Robinson in 1838 described it as "Frank Mountain", in reference to the Crusaders.

The modern English name is a transliteration of the Greek spelling. This is followed by the Modern Arabic and the Modern Hebrew (Herodion ). The name Herodis was found in the 1960s inscribed in one of the Bar Kokhba letters recovered from the Muraba’at Caves in the Judaean desert, and is thought to represent the original Hebrew name for the site.

History

Construction
In 40 BCE, after the Parthian conquest of Syria, Herod fled to Masada. On the way, at the location of Herodion, Herod clashed with Jews loyal to his enemy Antigonus, and emerged victorious. According to the Roman Jewish historian Josephus, he "built a town on that spot in commemoration of his victory, and enhanced it with wonderful palaces... and he called it Herodion after himself".

Josephus describes Herodium as follows:

Archaeologists believe that the palace was designed by architects and built by slaves and paid workers (contractors).  Herod was considered one of the greatest builders of his time and was not daunted by geography—his palace was built on the edge of the desert and was situated atop an artificial hill. The largest of the four towers was built on a stone base 18 meters in diameter. This was most likely where Herod lived; he decorated his rooms with mosaic floors and elaborate frescoes. The other three towers, which consisted of living spaces and storage, were 16 meters in diameter. Outside, several cisterns were built to collect water that was channeled into the palace.

Great Revolt
Herodium was conquered and destroyed by the Romans in 71 CE.

Bar Kokhba revolt

At the beginning of the Bar Kokhba revolt sixty years later, Simon bar Kokhba declared Herodium as his secondary headquarters. The fortress was commanded by Yeshua ben Galgula, who was likely in Bar Kokhba's second or third line of command. Archaeological evidence for the revolt was found all over the site, from the outside buildings to the water system under the mountain. Inside the water system, supporting walls built by the rebels were discovered, and another system of caves was found. Inside one of the caves, burned wood was found which was dated to the time of the revolt.

Excavation history

Upper Herodium
The archaeological excavation of Herodium was begun in 1962 by Virgilio Canio Corbo and Stanislao Loffreda, from the Studium Biblicum Franciscanum of Jerusalem, and it continued until 1967: they discovered the upper citadel, at the top of the hill.

Pilate ring
In 1968–1969, during excavations directed by archaeologist Gideon Foerster, at a section of Herod's burial tomb and palace hundreds of artifacts were found, including a copper alloy ring. The ring was overlooked but in 2018 it was given a thorough laboratory cleaning and scholarly examination. At the center of the ring is an engraved krater, or amphora similar in style to the monumental urn (handleless amphorae or acroteria) of Herodium  which is encircled by "partly deformed" Greek letters spelling out "of Pilates" in Greek. Although scientists were not sure about who is the "Pilates" mentioned on the ring, media published that it could have possibly belonged to Pontius Pilate. Archaeologist Roi Porat said that all explanations are equally possible for the owner of the ring: "It was important to publish a careful scientific article, but in practice we have a ring inscribed with the name Pilate and the personal connection just cries out."
While much of the debate has focused on the Greek name inscribed on the ring, the image is of equal significance and may further support that this was the ring used by Pilate's administrative assistant for sealing documents for Pilate. The image on the ring is possibly associated with Roman religious ceremonies (i.e., suovetaurilia, bacchanalia) and the imperial cult that were characteristic of the images on the coins that Pilate had minted during his term as governor.

Lower Herodium
From 1972, excavations were carried out by Ehud Netzer, working on behalf of the Hebrew University of Jerusalem, and they were intermittent until the archaeologist's death in 2010. Netzer excavated mostly the lower palace, at the base of the hill.

Description

Herod's hilltop palace

Herod the Great built a palace within the fortress of Herodium. Herod himself commissioned a lavish palace to be built between 23 and 15 BCE atop Herodium for all to see. The palace itself consisted of four towers of seven stories, a bathhouse, courtyards, a Roman theatre, banquet rooms, a large walkway ("the course"), as well as extravagant living quarters for himself and guests. Once Herod died and the Great Revolt started, Herodium was abandoned. The Jews eventually had a base at Herodium where they built a synagogue which can still be seen today, unlike much of Herod's Palace.

Bathhouse
The Roman bathhouse consisted of three areas, the caldarium, the tepidarium, and the frigidarium. It also had a very impressive dome which is still in good condition today despite thousands of years of earthquakes and wars. The caldarium had vaulted ceilings, raised floors, and channels in the walls to conduct heat. The tepidarium had mosaic floors and frescoes just like the living quarters of the palace. The frigidarium, the last stop in the bathhouse, was where guests would cool off in a large pool.

Synagogue
A pre-year-70 synagogue at Herodium is of the Galilean-type, featuring stone benches built along the walls and aisles formed by columns that supported the roof. It is one of the oldest synagogues in the Levant.

Theatre
Netzer discovered the Roman Theatre just before his death in late 2010. The royal theatre was uncovered near the base of Herod's tomb (see Tomb of Herod). The theatre contained an elaborately decorated loggia, or a theatre box, was discovered. This means that when Herod or other notable officials went to see a play, they would receive luxury treatment. The rest of the audience would be seated below on benches that could accommodate about 450-650 people. What is quite unique about this find is that frescoes of landscapes were discovered, of a kind suggesting that the painters were well travelled; they depict scenes of Italy and even the Nile River in Egypt. It is also assumed that the painters were on loan to Herod from Caesar in Rome.

Tomb of Herod
Later excavations strengthened the idea that this site is Herod's mausoleum. The base of the tomb has now been uncovered and is visible to visitors to the site.

The 2009–2010 excavations uncovered near the tomb base a small 450-seat capacity (see Theatre).

Netzer died in October 2010 from injuries sustained from a fall at the site, and access to the mausoleum was subsequently blocked to the public pending review of the site's safety.

In October 2013, archaeologists Joseph Patrich and Benjamin Arubas challenged the identification of the tomb as that of Herod. According to Patrich and Arubas, the tomb is too modest to be Herod's and has several unlikely features. Roi Porat, who replaced Netzer as excavation leader after the latter's death, stood by the identification.

Fragments of three stone sarcophagi were found near the mausoleum: one of them was reddish and the other two light-colored. The reddish sarcophagus, decorated in an sumptuous but restrained style, was identified by the excavators as Herod's sarcophagus. It was found smashed into hundreds of pieces. Scholars suggested that this sarcophagus held the king's body and was destroyed by Jewish rebels during the Jewish-Roman war. The sarcophagus is displayed today at the Israel Museum.

Legal aspects

In February 2013 an exhibit dedicated to Herod at the Israel Museum featured finds from among some 30 tons of material transferred from the Herodium site back into Israel. The Palestinian National Authority protested, and Rula Maayah, the Palestinian tourism and antiquities minister said that according to international law Israelis have no right to excavate Herodium, which is in the occupied West Bank, or to take any antiquities from it. Palestinian officials compared the exhibition to the historical plunder of archaeological treasures by former colonial powers. Some Israeli commentators have argued that, such excavations of, and removal of material from, sites in the Palestinian territories go beyond what is permitted to an occupying power such as Israel. One Israeli archaeologist, Yonathan Mizrachi, in an article co-written with Yigal Bronner, stated that, 'Since Herodion and Herod's palaces in Jericho are located in the territories that Israel occupied in 1967, they are—according to international law, the codes of ethics for the preservation of antiquities, and even the Oslo Accords—supposedly under Palestinian control and responsibility.' The Israel Museum's director, James S. Snyder initially stated that the items from Herodium would be returned to the West Bank after the exhibition, "in better condition than before", but later clarified that this did not mean the artifacts would be returned to the Palestinians after the exhibition. The site is in Area C of the West Bank, under full Israeli control. The Israel Museum cited the Oslo Accords as giving Israel a right to perform archaeology in the territories and said they will return it to the West Bank when the exhibition has ended. In analyzing the controversy, Morag Kersel states that the site is regulated by Israeli military orders, the Jordanian Temporary Law no. 51, 1966, and the Oslo Accords. According to the provisions of the Oslo II Accord, archaeological issues of common interest would be handled by a joint Israel-Palestinian committee. Few if any of these agreements have been implemented, and Palestinians have not been consulted or asked to collaborate in the work at the site.

Films
Herod's Lost Tomb (2008; National Geographic Society), in addition to examining Netzer's purported find of Herod's tomb, the palace and most of Herod's other large projects are reconstructed in CGI.
"Finding Jesus: Faith, Fact, Forgery: Season 2, Episode 4: The tomb of Herod" (2017; CNN), the episode unpacks the epic story of the client king of Judea.
Jesus Christ Superstar (1973), the song "Then We Are Decided" was filmed here.

See also
 Herodian architecture
 John McRay
 Machaerus

References

External links

 The Herodium excavations (in memory of Ehud Netzer) – official site
 Google Maps satellite view
 Herodion Jacqueline Schaalje
 “Mount of Paradise” – “Mount of Franks” – “Herodium” An alternate history of this mountain.
 Photos from Herodion

70s disestablishments in the Roman Empire
130s disestablishments in the Roman Empire
1962 archaeological discoveries
Archaeological sites in the West Bank
Establishments in the Herodian kingdom
Herod the Great
Jews and Judaism in the Roman Empire
Jewish–Roman wars
Judaean Desert
Mountain monuments and memorials
Tombs in the State of Palestine